The A371 is a primary road in England running from Wincanton to Weston-super-Mare in North Somerset, through Shepton Mallet, Croscombe, Wells, Westbury-sub-Mendip, Rodney Stoke, Draycott, Cheddar, Axbridge, Winscombe, Banwell and Weston-super-Mare.

The A371 starts at the A303, then passes Castle Cary, Ansford, Cannard's Grave (where it briefly joins the A37), Shepton Mallet, Croscombe, Wells, Westbury-sub-Mendip, Rodney Stoke, Draycott, Cheddar, Axbridge (where it briefly joins the A38), Winscombe, Banwell and Locking before finishing at the A370.

En route the A371 passes through the Mendip Hills and near to some major tourist destinations such as the Bath and West showground, Wells Cathedral, Wookey Hole Caves, Cheddar Gorge and The Helicopter Museum and Junction 21 Enterprise Area where the road finishes in Weston-super-Mare.

References 

Roads in England
Roads in Somerset